Austin Capitals may refer to:

Austin Capitals (basketball), a planned Austin, Texas, based franchise in the American Basketball Association
Austin Capitals (soccer), an Austin, Texas, based team in the Premier Arena Soccer League